Kondratovo is a rural locality (a village) in Kichmegnskoye Rural Settlement, Kichmengsko-Gorodetsky District, Vologda Oblast, Russia. The population was 75 as of 2002.

Geography 
Kondratovo is located 32 km southwest of Kichmengsky Gorodok (the district's administrative centre) by road. Kurilovo is the nearest rural locality.

References 

Rural localities in Kichmengsko-Gorodetsky District